USS Hornet (CV-8), the seventh U.S. Navy vessel of that name, was a  of the United States Navy. 

During World War II in the Pacific Theater, she launched the Doolittle Raid on Tokyo and participated in the Battle of Midway and the Buin-Faisi-Tonolai raid. In the Solomon Islands campaign, she was involved in the capture and defense of Guadalcanal and the Battle of the Santa Cruz Islands, where she was irreparably damaged by enemy torpedo and dive bombers. Faced with an approaching Japanese surface force, Hornet was abandoned and later torpedoed and sunk by approaching Japanese destroyers. Hornet was in service for one year and six days, and was the last US fleet carrier ever sunk by enemy fire. For these actions, she was awarded four service stars and a citation for the Doolittle Raid in 1942, and her Torpedo Squadron 8 received a Presidential Unit Citation for extraordinary heroism for its performance at the Battle of Midway. 

Her wreck was located in late January 2019 near the Solomon Islands.

Construction and commissioning 

Because of the limit on aggregate aircraft carrier tonnage included in the Washington Naval Treaty and subsequent London treaties, the United States had intended to build two Yorktown-class aircraft carriers and use the remaining allocated tonnage for a smaller, revised version of the same design, which eventually became . With war looming in Europe and the repudiation of the naval limitation treaties by Japan and Italy, the Navy's General Board decided to lay down a third carrier of the Yorktown design immediately - followed by the first carrier of the succeeding Essex class (CV-9). When the design was finalized, authorization from Congress came in the Naval Expansion Act of 1938.

She was designed for a ship's crew consisting of 86 officers and 1280 men and an air complement consisting of 141 officers and 710 men.

During sea trials, she produced  and reached .

Hornet was equipped with 8 /38 caliber dual-purpose guns and 16 /75 caliber anti-aircraft guns in quad mounts (four guns operating together). Originally, she had 24 M2 Browning  machine guns, but these were replaced in January 1942 with 30 20-mm Oerlikon anti-aircraft cannon.  An additional  quad mount was later added at her bow and two more 20 mm anti-aircraft guns were added for a total of 32 mounts. In addition, her athwartships hangar-deck aircraft catapult was removed. In June 1942, following the battle of Midway, Hornet had a new CXAM radar installed atop her tripod mast, and her SC radar was relocated to her mainmast.  Unlike her sisters, Hornets tripod mast and its signal bridge were not enclosed when the CXAM was installed, making her unique among the three ships.

The flight and hangar decks were unarmored though the protective deck was  STS. The steering gear had  protection on the sides with splinter protection on the deck.

She was designed to host a Carrier Air Group of 18 fighters, 18 bombers, 37 scout planes, 18 torpedo bombers, and six utility aircraft.

Hornet was laid down on 25 September 1939 by Newport News Shipbuilding of Newport News, Virginia, and was launched on 14 December 1940, sponsored by Annie Reid Knox, wife of Secretary of the Navy Frank M. Knox. She was commissioned at Naval Station Norfolk on 20 October 1941, with Captain Marc A. Mitscher in command.

Service history 

Before the attack on Pearl Harbor, Hornet trained out of Norfolk. A hint of a future mission occurred on 2 February 1942 when Hornet departed Norfolk with two Army Air Forces B-25 Mitchell medium bombers on deck. Once at sea, the planes were launched to the surprise and amazement of Hornets crew. Her men were unaware of the meaning of this experiment. Hornet returned to Norfolk, prepared to leave for combat, and sailed for the West Coast on 4 March via the Panama Canal.

Doolittle Raid, April 1942 

Hornet arrived at Naval Air Station Alameda, California, on 20 March 1942 with her own planes on the hangar deck. By midafternoon on 1 April, she loaded 16 B-25s on the flight deck, under the command of Lieutenant Colonel James H. Doolittle, 70 United States Army Air Corps officers and 64 enlisted men reported aboard. In company of her escort, Hornet departed Alameda on 2 April under sealed orders. That afternoon, Captain Mitscher informed his men of their mission: a bombing raid on Japan.

Eleven days later, Hornet joined the aircraft carrier  at Midway, and Task Force 16 turned toward Japan. With Enterprise providing combat air patrol cover, Hornet was to steam deep into enemy waters. Originally, the task force intended to proceed to within  of the Japanese coast, but on the morning of 18 April, a Japanese patrol boat, No. 23 Nitto Maru, sighted the American task force.  sank the patrol boat. Amid concerns that the Japanese had been made aware of their presence, Doolittle and his raiders launched prematurely from  out, instead of the planned . Because of this decision, none of the 16 planes made it to their designated landing strips in China. After the war, Tokyo was found to have received the Nitto Maru'''s message in a garbled form and  the Japanese ship was sunk before it could get a clear message through to the Japanese mainland.

As Hornet came about and prepared to launch the bombers, which had been readied for take-off the previous day, a gale of more than  churned the sea with  crests. Heavy swells, which caused the ship to pitch violently, shipped sea and spray over the bow, wetted the flight deck, and drenched the deck crews. The lead plane, commanded by Colonel Doolittle, had only  of flight deck, while the last B-25 hung its twin rudders far out over the fantail. Doolittle, timing himself against the rise and fall of the ship's bow, lumbered down the flight deck, circled Hornet after take-off, and set course for Japan. By 09:20, all 16 were airborne, heading for the first American air strike against the Japanese home islands.Hornet brought her own planes on deck as Task Force 16 steamed at full speed for Pearl Harbor. Intercepted broadcasts, both in Japanese and English, confirmed at 14:46 the success of the raids. Exactly one week to the hour after launching the B-25s, Hornet sailed into Pearl Harbor. That the Tokyo raid was the Hornets mission was kept an official secret for a year. Until then, President Roosevelt referred to the ship from which the bombers were launched only as "Shangri-La." On 4 May, Task Force 16 crossed the equator; the first time ever for Hornet. Hornet, alongside Enterprise, executed a feint towards Nauru and Banaba (Ocean) islands, which caused the Japanese to cancel their operation to seize the two islands. She returned to Hawaii on 26 May, and sailed again two days later to help repulse an expected Japanese assault on Midway.

 Battle of Midway, June 1942 

Japanese carrier-based planes were reported headed for Midway in the early morning of 4 June. Hornet, Yorktown, and Enterprise launched aircraft, just as the Japanese carriers struck their planes below to prepare for a second attack on Midway. Hornet's dive bombers followed an incorrect heading and did not find the enemy fleet. Several bombers and all of the escorting fighters were forced to ditch when they ran out of fuel attempting to return to the ship. 15 torpedo bombers of Torpedo Squadron 8 (VT-8) found the Japanese ships and attacked. They were met by overwhelming fighter opposition about  out, and with no escorts to protect them, they were shot down. Ensign George H. Gay, USNR, was the only survivor of 30 men.

Further attacks from Enterprise's and Yorktown's torpedo bombers proved equally disastrous, but succeeded in forcing the Japanese carriers to keep their decks clear for combat air patrol operations, rather than launching a counter-attack against the Americans. Japanese fighters were shooting down the last of the torpedo bombers over  when dive bombers of Enterprise and Yorktown attacked, causing enormous fires aboard the three other Japanese carriers, ultimately leading to their loss. Hiryū was hit late in the afternoon of 4 June by a strike from Enterprise and sank early the next morning. Hornet's aircraft, launching late due to the necessity of recovering Yorktown's scout planes and faulty communications, attacked a battleship and other escorts, but failed to score hits. Yorktown was lost to combined aerial and submarine attack.Hornets aircraft attacked the fleeing Japanese fleet on 6 June and assisted in sinking the heavy cruiser , damaging a destroyer, and leaving the heavy cruiser  heavily damaged and on fire. The attack by Hornet on the Mogami ended one of the great decisive battles of naval history. Midway Atoll was saved as an important base for American operations into the Western Pacific Ocean. Of greatest importance was the crippling of the Japanese carrier strength, a severe blow from which the Imperial Japanese Navy never fully recovered. The four large carriers took with them to the bottom about 250 naval aircraft and a high percentage of the most highly trained and experienced Japanese aircraft maintenance personnel. The victory at Midway was a decisive turning point in the War in the Pacific.

On 16 June 1942, Captain Charles P. Mason became commanding officer of Hornet upon her return to Pearl Harbor. Hornet spent the next six weeks replenishing her stores, having minor repairs performed, and most importantly, having additional light antiaircraft guns and the new RCA CXAM air-search radar fitted. She did not sail in late July with the forces sent to recapture Guadalcanal, but instead remained at Pearl Harbor in case she was  needed elsewhere.

 Solomon Islands campaign, August–October, 1942 Hornet steamed out of harbor on 17 August 1942 to guard sea approaches to the bitterly contested Guadalcanal in the Solomon Islands. She was responsible for providing air cover over the Solomon Islands until 24 October 1942, when she was joined by Enterprise just northwest of the New Hebrides Islands. Both carriers and their escorts steamed out to intercept a Japanese aircraft carrier/battleship/cruiser force closing in on Guadalcanal.

 Battle of the Santa Cruz Islands 

The Battle of the Santa Cruz Islands took place on 26 October 1942 without contact between surface ships of the opposing forces. That morning, Enterprises planes bombed the carrier , while planes from Hornet severely damaged the carrier  and the heavy cruiser . Two other cruisers were also attacked by Hornets aircraft. Meanwhile, Hornet was attacked by a coordinated dive bomber and torpedo plane attack. In a 15-minute period, Hornet was hit by three bombs from Aichi D3A "Val" dive bombers. One "Val", after being heavily damaged by antiaircraft fire while approaching Hornet, crashed into the carrier's island, killing seven men and spreading burning aviation gas over the deck. A flight of Nakajima B5N "Kate" torpedo bombers attacked Hornet and scored two hits, which seriously damaged the electrical systems and engines. As the carrier came to a halt, another damaged "Val" deliberately crashed into Hornet's port side near the bow.

With power knocked out to her engines, Hornet was unable to launch or land aircraft, forcing her aviators to either land on Enterprise or ditch in the ocean. Rear Admiral George D. Murray ordered the heavy cruiser  to tow Hornet clear of the action. Repair crews were on the verge of restoring power when another flight of nine "Kate" torpedo planes attacked. Eight of these aircraft were either shot down or failed to score hits, but the ninth scored a fatal hit on the starboard side. The torpedo hit destroyed the repairs to the electrical system and caused a 14° list. After being informed that Japanese surface forces were approaching and that further towing efforts were futile, Vice Admiral William Halsey ordered Hornet sunk, and an order of "abandon ship" was issued. Captain Mason, the last man on board, climbed over the side, and the survivors were soon picked up by the escorting destroyers.

The destroyers steamed away when a Japanese surface force entered the area. The Japanese destroyers  and  finally finished off Hornet with 4  Long Lance torpedoes. At 01:35 on 27 October, Hornet finally sank with the loss of 140 of her 2,200 sailors. 21 aircraft went down with the ship.

 Legacy Hornet was struck from the Naval Vessel Register on 13 January 1943. CV-8 is honored aboard her namesake, which is now the USS Hornet Museum docked in Alameda, California.Hornet was the last American fleet carrier (CV) ever sunk by enemy fire, though the light carrier Princeton and a number of much smaller escort carriers were sunk in combat in other battles following Hornet's sinking.

 Wreck discovery 
The expedition team, largely funded by Paul Allen, aboard the Petrel, used information from the archives of nine other U.S. warships that saw the carrier shortly before she was sunk. One of two robotic vehicles aboard the Petrel found the Hornet during its first dive mission. The carrier lies upright on the ocean floor, with her signal bridge and a section of her stern that broke away coming to rest around her.

 Awards Hornet was awarded four battle stars during World War II.

In addition, Torpedo Squadron 8 flying from Hornet'' was awarded the Presidential Unit Citation. "for extraordinary heroism and distinguished service beyond the call of duty" during the Battle of Midway.

Notes

References

External links 

 
 
 
 
 
 
 
 

Yorktown-class aircraft carriers
1940 ships
World War II aircraft carriers of the United States
Ships of the Battle of Midway
World War II shipwrecks in the Pacific Ocean
Ships built in Newport News, Virginia
Doolittle Raid
Maritime incidents in October 1942
Shipwreck discoveries by Paul Allen
2019 archaeological discoveries